Keller Golf Course is a classic parkland golf course in Maplewood, Minnesota, a suburb of St. Paul. The course is historically significant for its long association with the early days of professional golf; it hosted the PGA Tour's St. Paul Open from 1930 to 1968; two majors, the 1932 and 1954 PGA Championships; the 1949 Western Open (a near-major at the time), and in the 1970s, the LPGA Tour's Patty Berg Classic. The course was renovated by architect Richard Mandell and reopened in 2014 after a 2-year closure.

History
The course is owned and operated by Ramsey County and is open to the public. 

Paul Coates, a Ramsey County civil engineer, designed the course and supervised its construction. Prior to beginning, Coates used his personal vacation to visit some of America's great golf courses, such as Pinehurst, to learn the basics of course architecture. Despite its lack of designer "pedigree," Keller is among the most distinguished courses in the Twin Cities, and is known for its creative, strategic use of rolling terrain.

The course continues to host Minnesota Golf Association and regional United States Golf Association tournaments and qualifying events. At , one might expect the course would yield low scores to today's long hitters. However, even the area's best amateurs rarely "go low."  Winning scores for regional events typically hover around 68 or 69 by even the area's best players.

Weather-permitting, the course superintendent is known for maintaining firm greens, in contrast to many heavily watered public courses. Good players, in particular, appreciate the strategic value in playing to greens that will not accept just any shot, and put a premium on the player's shot-making skill.

The Keller Men's Club (250 members) and Ladies' Club (175 members) are very active, and hold many club events and tournaments throughout the summer. There is routinely a waiting list of several years for Men's Club membership.

The elegant clubhouse, designed by locally significant architect Cap Wigington, is rich in golf history and atmosphere. Photos of every professional golfer who won at Keller are displayed on the walls. The list includes eight male and four female Hall of Fame honorees.

The course was closed in October, 2012 for major renovations and reopened in July, 2014, to very good reviews. Architect Richard Mandell was careful to retain the course's original layout, but all of the greens and bunkers were replaced and brought up to modern standards.  The fairways were converted to bent grass. Mandell's work was recognized by Golf Magazine as the "Best Municipal Renovation" of 2014.  Additionally, the original clubhouse and pro shop were demolished and replaced with new buildings.

Tournaments hosted

Major championships

St. Paul Open

Patty Berg Classic

Amateur championships

Notes

External links

Buildings and structures in Ramsey County, Minnesota
Golf clubs and courses in Minnesota
Sports venues in Minneapolis–Saint Paul
1929 establishments in Minnesota
Sports venues completed in 1929